Sophie Pauline von Weiler (born 24 December 1958) is a retired Dutch field hockey forward, who won the gold medal at the 1984 Summer Olympics.

Four years later in Seoul she captured the bronze medal with the national side. From 1978 to 1988 she played a total number of 137 international matches for Holland, in which she scored 69 goals. She retired after the 1988 Summer Olympics in South Korea. In the 1990s Von Weiler had a short spell with the Dutch Women's Team, when she was manager of the national side.

References

External links
 

1958 births
Living people
Dutch female field hockey players
Olympic field hockey players of the Netherlands
Field hockey players at the 1984 Summer Olympics
Field hockey players at the 1988 Summer Olympics
Olympic gold medalists for the Netherlands
Olympic bronze medalists for the Netherlands
Sportspeople from 's-Hertogenbosch
Olympic medalists in field hockey

Medalists at the 1988 Summer Olympics
Medalists at the 1984 Summer Olympics